, son of regent Michika, was a Japanese kugyō (court noble) of the Edo period (1603–1868). He held a regent position kampaku from 1791 to 1795. His wife was a daughter of the eighth head of Wakayama Domain Tokugawa Shigenori. The couple had one daughter and two sons: Ichijō Tadayoshi, and another who was adopted by Saionji family and became known as 西園寺 実韶.

Family
 Father: Ichijo Michika
 Mother: Ikeda Shizuko
 Wife: Tokugawa Atsuko
 Children:
 Ichijo Tadayoshi by Atsuko
 Saionji Sanetsugu (1778-1787)  by Atsuko
 Kazuko married Sanjo Ukinosa by Atsuko
 Teruko married Prince Fushimi-no-miya Sadayuki by Atsuko

References
 

1756 births
1795 deaths
Fujiwara clan
Ichijō family